Xinzhou Teachers University (Xīnzhōu shīfàn xuéyuàn) is a university in Shanxi, China under the authority of the provincial government.

External links
Official website

Universities and colleges in Hebei